Chrysoglossa submaxima is a moth of the family Notodontidae first described by Hering in 1925. It is found in Panama, Costa Rica and Nicaragua.

References

Moths described in 1925
Notodontidae